The Church of the Annunciation is a Grade II* listed Gothic Revival Catholic church in the Charminster area of Bournemouth, Dorset, England. The church stands across Charminster Road from St Alban's Church.

History 
The Church was built in 1905-6, and was the first church designed by Giles Gilbert Scott with help from George Frederick Bodley. It was originally built as a chapel of ease to the Church of the Sacred Heart, to meet the needs of Catholics who were unable to travel to the latter church in central Bournemouth.

References

See also 

 List of churches in Bournemouth

Churches in Bournemouth
Grade II* listed churches in Dorset
Roman Catholic churches in Dorset
Gothic Revival church buildings in England
Gothic Revival architecture in Dorset
Churches completed in 1906
1906 establishments in England
20th-century Roman Catholic church buildings in the United Kingdom
Grade II* listed Roman Catholic churches in England